Požarnica is a village located in the municipality of Tuzla, Bosnia and Herzegovina. It is located on the Majevica mountain 6 kilometers east of the city of Tuzla.

History
Before the Bosnian War, Požarnica had a population of about 4,000 Bosnian Serbs. During and after the war, the Serb families relocated to homes in the Republika Srpska entity of the country and some to neighboring Serbia. It is partially occupied today by Bosniak refugees from the Drina Valley.

Oil
There exists the possibility that Požarnica lies on an oil field. Oil wells were drilled in the area beginning in 1930 in the villages Rožanj and Zavid on Majevica mountain. Drilling moved to Požarnica and surrounding villages in 1934, lasting until 1941, with little evidence of the presence of oil. Another investigation took place in 1949, and 2013.

Demographics 
According to the 2013 census, its population was 190.

References

External links
https://web.archive.org/web/20070501080425/http://www.pozarnica.net/
http://www.maplandia.com/bosnia-and-herzegovina/federacija-bosne-i-hercegovine/pozarnica/

Populated places in Tuzla